Mollie Geraldine Dyer  (1927–1998) was a Yorta Yorta woman who was an Aboriginal Child Welfare Worker and Aboriginal community worker, best known for co-founding the Victorian Aboriginal Child Care Agency in 1977.

Auntie Mollie, as she became known, was the daughter of Margaret Tucker, an Aboriginal activist involved in establishing Australian Aborigines League, and Philip Tucker, an Irish man. Dyer grew up in Hawthorn and Hastings, and was educated at a convent school in Abbotsford where she was the only Aboriginal pupil. She would frequently travel to New South Wales to stay with her mother's family at Cummeragunja Mission.

When Dyer's father was serving overseas during World War II, Dyer, aged 15, left school to enter the workforce, where she experienced significant racism. Dyer's first marriage, to Alan Burns in 1947, produced six children all of whom were to become involved in Aboriginal community work and activism, and then married Charlie Dyer. In addition to her six biological children, Dyer would foster 19 children and provide short term accommodation for many more throughout her life.

In the 1960s and 1970s, Dyer worked with a group of fellow Aboriginal women to establish and deliver services to the Aboriginal community despite a lack of funding. In 1966, Dyer accepted a full-time position with the Aborigines Advancement League, continuing and formalising her welfare work.

When the Victorian Aboriginal Legal Service was established in 1973, Dyer moved to a position there.

In 1976, Dyer delivered a speech at a national adoption conference and this instigated discussion of an Aboriginal-run agency to support Aboriginal children and families. The Victorian Aboriginal Child Care Agency was established and Dyer served as Program Director, and soon similar organisations were established in other parts of Australia. Dyer worked to establish the Secretariat of National Aboriginal and Islander Child Care (SNAICC) in 1981.

Dyer was part of the group that establish the Brambuk Living Cultural Centre in Halls Gap.

Dyer received the Member of the Order of Australia medal in 1979 in recognition of service to the Aboriginal community.  She also received an International Year of the Child Award and an Advance Australia Medal. The Victorian Aboriginal Child Care Agency headquarters was named in her honour. A street in the ACT suburb of Bonner is named after her.

Memoir
Dyer's memoir Room for One More: The Life of Mollie Dyer was published in 2003, although it had been written before Dyer's 1998 death.

References

External links
 Mollie Dyer AM: A voice for those most vulnerable, Aboriginal Victoria, State Government of Victoria, Access Date: 28 June 2021.

1927 births
1998 deaths
People from New South Wales
Australian indigenous rights activists
Women human rights activists
Indigenous Australian welfare workers
People from Hawthorn, Victoria
20th-century Australian women